Begue or Bégué or Bègue is a surname. Notable people with the surname include:

Ambroise Begue (born 1995), French footballer
Georges Bégué (1911–1993), French engineer
Gloria Begué Cantón (1931–2016), Spanish professor, jurist, senator and magistrate
Lambert le Bègue, priest and reformer
René Le Bègue (1914–1946), French race car driver
Valérie Bègue (born 1985), French reality television personality and beauty pageant titleholder

See also
Bègues, Allier, France